Williamwood railway station is a railway station in the Williamwood area of the town of Clarkston, East Renfrewshire, Greater Glasgow, Scotland. The station is managed by ScotRail and lies on the Neilston branch of the Cathcart Circle Lines.
The line here forms the boundary which separates Clarkston and Giffnock.

Facilities 

There is waiting room within the ticket office for passengers travelling towards  and a waiting room and a shelter on the opposite platform for passengers travelling towards . Additionally, there is a Metro newspaper dispenser. At present, there is no access for disabled people as both entrances have significant numbers of steps.

History 
The station was originally opened by the London, Midland and Scottish Railway on 9 July 1929 on the former Lanarkshire and Ayrshire Railway.

The station is currently fully operational, with a part-time booking office. It is an intermediate station on the Glasgow Central – Neilston line. The railway was electrified in the early 1960s and  "Blue Train" electric multiple units provided almost all trains services for many years thereafter. Until late 2019, services were primarily operated by ageing Class 314 EMUs, until a few months before their withdrawal.

As a cost-saving measure, the three stations south of Williamwood (i.e. Neilston, Patterton and Whitecraigs) were considered for possible closure in 1983 by the Strathclyde PTE but were reprieved.

Services 
Services are now operated mainly by 4 car Class 380/1 EMUs, with the 3 coach Class 318 EMUs and Class 320 EMUs working together to provide 6 coach services at peak times. Two trains an hour operate in each direction calling all stops from Glasgow Central to Neilston. Additionally, additional peak time services operate between Central and Neilston, calling only from Muirend through to the terminus.

References

Notes

Sources 

 
 

Railway stations in East Renfrewshire
Former London, Midland and Scottish Railway stations
Railway stations in Great Britain opened in 1929
Railway stations served by ScotRail
Clarkston, East Renfrewshire